Justin Jeremy Walters (born 23 October 1980) is a South African professional golfer. His mother is English and he has played for England in team play.

Walters played college golf at Huntingdon College, winning the 2001 NAIA Championship. He then transferred to North Carolina State University where he won three times and was an All-American in 2002 and 2003. He turned professional in 2003.

Walters plays on the Sunshine Tour where he has won twice, most recently at the 2011 Investec Royal Swazi Open. He began playing on the Challenge Tour in 2012.

Walters has finished runner-up four times on the European Tour; twice at the Portugal Masters in 2013 and 2019, as well as the Joburg Open in 2014. He also tied for the lead after 72 holes at the 2020 ISPS Handa UK Championship, but was defeated in a playoff by Rasmus Højgaard.

Professional wins (3)

Sunshine Tour wins (2)

Tarheel Tour wins (1)
2005 Statesville Open

Playoff record
European Tour playoff record (0–1)

Results in major championships

"T" = Tied
CUT = missed the halfway cut

Team appearances
Amateur
Palmer Cup (representing Great Britain & Ireland): 2002

See also
2012 Challenge Tour graduates
2015 European Tour Qualifying School graduates
2017 European Tour Qualifying School graduates

References

External links

South African male golfers
NC State Wolfpack men's golfers
Sunshine Tour golfers
European Tour golfers
Golfers from Johannesburg
1980 births
Living people